The 2019–20 Irish Super League season was the 47th running of Basketball Ireland's premier men's basketball competition. The season featured 12 teams from across the Republic of Ireland and Northern Ireland. The regular season began on 21 September 2019 and was scheduled to end on 14 March 2020. However, on 11 March 2020, Basketball Ireland suspended the league with one round to go due to the COVID-19 pandemic. As a result, Belfast Star were declared the season champions.

Teams

League
The 2019–20 season was cut short by one round due to the COVID-19 pandemic, with Tralee Warriors initially finishing on top of the standings with a 17–4 record. However, due to Tralee committing an unintentional rule violation by playing an illegal player in December 2019, they were stripped of two wins (six points) and thus Belfast Star were declared the season champions.

Standings

Results

*Later declared 0–20 losses for Tralee Warriors due to playing an illegal player. As a result, Tralee Warriors dropped from 17–4 to 15–6, while UCD Marian and Éanna both moved from 13–8 to 14–7.

National Cup

Round 1

Round 2

Semi-finals

Final

Awards

Player of the Month

Coach of the Month

Statistics leaders
Stats as of the end of the regular season

Regular season
 Player of the Year: Delaney Blaylock (Belfast Star)
 Young Player of the Year: CJ Fulton (Belfast Star)
 Coach of the Year: Adrian Fulton (Belfast Star)
 All-Star First Team:
 Delaney Blaylock (Belfast Star)
 Lorcan Murphy (Templeogue)
 Stefan Zečević (Éanna)
 Paul Dick (Tralee Warriors)
 CJ Fulton (Belfast Star)
 All-Star Second Team:
 Mike Bonaparte (DCU Saints)
 Mike Garrow (UCD Marian)
 Allan Thomas (Killorglin)
 Nil Sabata (Neptune)
 Joshua Wilson (Éanna)
 All-Star Third Team:
 Jason Killeen (Templeogue)
 Jonathan Lawton (Tralee Warriors)
 Darin Johnson (Maree)
 Neil Randolph (Templeogue)
 Tomas Fernandez (Killester)

References

External links
Basketball Ireland
National Cup draw
2019–20 season preview

Irish
Super League (Ireland) seasons
Basket
Basket